Verkhnyaya Medveditsa is a rural locality and the administrative center of Nizhnemedveditsky Selsoviet Rural Settlement, Kursky District, Kursk Oblast, Russia. Population:

Geography 
The village is located 95.5 km from the Russia–Ukraine border, 14 km north-west of Kursk.

 Climate
Verkhnyaya Medveditsa has a warm-summer humid continental climate (Dfb in the Köppen climate classification).

Transport 
Verkhnyaya Medveditsa is located on the federal route  Crimea Highway (a part of the European route ), on the road of intermunicipal significance  ("Crimea Highway" – Verkhnyaya Medveditsa – Razinkovo), 12 km from the nearest railway halt Bukreyevka (railway line Oryol – Kursk).

The rural locality is situated 16.5 km from Kursk Vostochny Airport, 137 km from Belgorod International Airport and 216 km from Voronezh Peter the Great Airport.

References

Notes

Sources

Rural localities in Kursky District, Kursk Oblast